Pentti is a Finnish male given name and surname, a form of Bengt (Swedish for Benedict).

Pentti name is also used in fiction and music.

Given name

A–J
Pentti Aalto (1917–1998), Finnish linguist
Pentti Alonen (1925–2017), Finnish alpine skier 
Pentti Antila (1926–1997), Finnish agronomist and politician
Pentti Arajärvi (born 1948), Finnish academic and politician
Pentti Elo (1929–1991), Finnish hockey player
Pentti Eskola (1883–1964), Finnish geologist
Pentti Forsman (1917–2006), Finnish tennis player
Pentti Glan (1946–2017), Finnish-Canadian rock drummer
Pentti Haanpää (1905–1955), Finnish author
Pentti Hakkarainen (disambiguation), multiple people
Pentti Hämäläinen (1929–1984), Finnish boxer
Pentti Hämäläinen (bandy) (born 1927), Finnish bandy player
Pentti Hiidenheimo (1875–1918), Finnish politician
Pentti Holappa (1927–2017), Finnish politician
Pentti Ikonen (1934–2007), Finnish swimmer
Pentti Irjala (1911–1982), Finnish actor
Pentti Isotalo (1927–2021), Finnish ice hockey player

K–P
Pentti Kahma (born 1943), Finnish discus thrower
Pentti Karvonen (1931–2022), Finnish athlete
Pentti Kaskipuro (1930–2010), Finnish artist 
Pentti Kokkonen (born 1955), Finnish ski jumper
Pentti Kontula (1930–1987), Finnish boxer
Pentti Korhonen (born 1951), Finnish motorcycle racer
Pentti Koskela (born 1945), Finnish ice hockey player
Pentti Kotvio (1921–2001), Finnish weightlifter
Pentti Kouri (1949–2009), Finnish economist 
Pentti Kuukasjärvi (born 1946) Finnish athlete
Pentti Laaksonen (1929–2005), Finnish basketball player
Pentti Lammio (1919–1999), Finnish speed skater 
Pentti Linkola (1932–2020), Finnish ecologist
Pentti Linnosvuo (1933–2010), Finnish sport shooter
Pentti Lund (1925–2013), Finnish Canadian ice hockey
Pentti Matikainen (born 1950), Finnish hockey coach 
Pentti Niemi (1902–1962), Finnish Lutheran clergyman and politician
Pentti Niinivuori (1931–1988), Finnish boxer
Pentti Nikula (born 1939), Finnish pole vaulter
Pentti Oinonen (born 1952), Finnish politician
Pentti Paatsalo (1932–1996), Finnish swimmer
Pentti Pakarinen (1924–2007), Finnish ophthalmologist and politician
Pentti Papinaho (1926—1992), Finnish sculptor
Pentti Pekkarinen (1917–1975), Finnish politician
Pentti Pelkonen (born 1930), Finnish skier
Pentti Pesonen (born 1938), Finnish cross-country skier 
Pentti Pouttu (died 1597), Finnish–Swedish peasant rebellion leader
Pentti Punkari (born 1938), Finnish wrestler

R–Z
Pentti Raaskoski (born 1929), Finnish sprint canoer
Pentti Rekola (1934–2012), Finnish athlete
Pentti Repo (1930–1997), Finnish athlete
Pentti Rummakko (1943–2008), Finnish athlete
Pentti Saarman (1941–2021), Finnish boxer
Pentti Saikkonen (born 1952), Finnish statistician 
Pentti Salo (born 1941), Finnish wrestler
Pentti Sammallahti (born 1950), Finnish photographer
Pentti Siimes (1929–2016), Finnish actor
Pentti Siltaloppi (1917–2002), Finnish athlete 
Pentti Sinersaari (born 1956), Finnish athlete 
Pentti Snellman (1926–2007), Finnish athlete
Pentti Suomela (1917–2016), Finnish diplomat
Pentti Talvitie (1922–2003), Finnish diplomat 
Pentti Taskinen (1929–1973), Finnish biathlete
Pentti Tiusanen (1949–2018), Finnish politician 
Pentti Väänänen (1945–2020), Finnish politician
Pentti Vikström (born 1951), Finnish archer
Pentti Virrankoski (born 1929), Finnish historian

Surname
Eino Pentti (1906–1993), American athlete

References

Finnish masculine given names